Several ships have been named Perseverance.

British Age of Sail merchant hulls
Several "Age of Sail" merchant ships of the United Kingdom have been named Perseverance:

 was launched in Virginia. She made one voyage as a whaler, leaving England in February 1820 for Peru. The pirate Vicente Benavides captured her off Santa Maria island in March 1821, and later burnt her in the Tubul River. More than four of her crew were murdered.
 was built in 1797 at Stettin or Sweden and came into British hands in 1799. She made one voyage under charter to the British East India Company (EIC), and was lost in July 1803.
 was launched in 1801 as an East Indiaman. She made seven voyages for the EIC before she was sold in 1819 for breaking up. 
 was launched on the Thames in 1801 and made 16 whaling voyages to the coast of Africa, South East Asian waters, and the Pacific before she was broken up in 1841.
 , a 136-ton Australian colonial brig owned by Robert Campbell, wrecked in 1828 
  was launched in Sunderland. The Hudson's Bay Company, purchased her in 1891 and sold her in 1900. While working for The Bay, she made two voyages as a whaler in Hudson Bay and Davis Strait.

See also
  (1992-2003), a logistics and landing ship operated by the Republic of Singapore Navy
 , a privateer given a letter of marque by the Colonial Rebellion during the American Revolutionary War, that was involved in the court case Jennings v. The Perseverance
 , a steam-powered-oar propelled steam boat built by John Fitch (inventor) 
  (1966), a Wey barge preserved as a museum ship
 , any one of several vessels of the British Royal Navy

Citations

Merchant ships of the United Kingdom
Age of Sail merchant ships
Ship names